"The Patchwork Girl" is the fifth episode of Pretty Little Liars: The Perfectionists. It aired on Freeform on April 17, 2019. In the episode Alison attempts to get Taylor to return to the city. In addition, "The Perfectionists" begin to look deeper into Mason, their prime suspect; as their own relationship begins to fall apart. The episode was written by Joseph Dougherty and directed by Roger Kumble. It received mostly positive reviews and was watched live by 0.22 million viewers.

Plot
Taylor begins driving the trailer away with Alison still trapped inside. Mona begins questioning Ray Hogadorn and starts learning things about him. When Ava has trouble sharpening her pencil she opens it up and finds a note inside with coordinates. Ava comes up with a plan to drug Mason and pitches it to Caitlin and Dylan. Mona finds out that Ray was the one who wrote "They're watching" on Alison's wall.

Alison and Taylor begin talking and Taylor informs her that Mona's program also finds people who have similar traits. Caitlin tricks Mason into agreeing to go out to a cabin with her. Alison tells Taylor that she should come back with her but Taylor tells her that it isn't safe because someone is trying to kill her. Caitlin also tells Dylan that she is the mole. While Ava is planning the fashion show she finds a slide in the projector of Dylan having sex. Ava, Caitlin, and Dylan debate whether drugging Mason is the best way to do things.

Dana questions Mona about her and Alison's past including Alex and Mary Drake. Alison takes Taylor back to her house which used to be Taylor's. After waiting an hour in the cabin Ava, Caitlin, and Dylan think Mason isn't coming. Ava and Dylan leave but Caitlin continues waiting. Mason finally shows up at the cabin and Caitlin drugs his drink but he refuses to drink it. While Mason is building a fire Caitlin sneaks up behind him and knocks him out.

Dana stops Ava in the woods and attempts to get Ava to tell her who killed Nolan. Caitlin and Dylan are waiting to meet Ava but Caitlin is run over by a car just as Alison finds out that Taylor escaped.

Production

Development
Casting sessions for the episode and the previous episode took place in late October 2018 between director Roger Kumble, co-executive producer and director Norman Buckley as well as executive producer and writer Charlie Craig. Tech scouting for episodes four and five began on October 31, 2018; meanwhile actor Niki Koss shadowed both Kumble and Buckley during production of the two episodes. Filming for both episodes took place in November 2018 and concluded on November 21, 2018. Larry Reibman served as the episodes Director of Photography. A final playback on the episode prior to airing took place on February 26, 2019.

Casting
Noah Grey-Cabey and Klea Scott both reprised their roles for the fourth time as Mason Gregory and Dana Booker respectively after being cast in recurring roles for the series. Duffy Epstein made his second appearance as a guest star in this episode after being cast as Ray Hogodorn. Roxanne Sthathos also made her second appearance as Zoe and received a "co-starring" credit.

Reception

Critical response
Andrea Reiher with TV Guide stated that the episode "leaned heavily into its Pretty Little Liars roots". Meanwhile, a reviewer of the episode by the San Francisco News said "I was seriously ready to check out on the series, but this episode drew me back in and I’m hooked again". In addition, Kristen Perrone's review with Elite Daily says the episode "was a whirlwind of action, including cabin confrontations, a hit-and-run accident, more emotional blackmail". The episode debuted on the iTunes US TV Episodes Chart at #20 and has remained on the chart since the episode's airing.

Viewing figures
The episode was watched live by 0.22 million viewers and was the lowest rated episode at the time of the episode's airing.

Notes

References

External links
 

2019 American television episodes